Charles Frisenfeldt (9 October 1889 – 17 April 1976) was a Danish wrestler. He competed at the 1920 and 1924 Summer Olympics.

References

External links
 

1889 births
1976 deaths
Olympic wrestlers of Denmark
Wrestlers at the 1920 Summer Olympics
Wrestlers at the 1924 Summer Olympics
Danish male sport wrestlers
People from Gentofte Municipality
Sportspeople from the Capital Region of Denmark
20th-century Danish people